The Rocky Mountain Rugby Football Union is the Geographical Union (GU) for rugby union teams playing in the Colorado, Utah and Wyoming. It is an association of youth, high school, collegiate, and adult men's and women's rugby teams in the Rocky Mountain under USA Rugby.

Division 2
 Glendale Raptors D2	
 Provo Steelers	
 Boulder Rugby
 Denver Barbarians D2	
 Park City Haggis
 Denver Harlequins

Division 3
 Denver Highlanders
 Colorado Springs Grizzlies	
 Queen City Rams
 Glendale Raptors D3	
 Northern Colorado Flamingos
 Denver Harlequins D3

Division 4
 Littleton Eagles
 Boulder Rugby D4	
 Colorado Springs Grizzlies D4	
 Laramie Lumberjacks
 Queen City Rams D4	
 Denver Harlequins D4	
 Colorado Rush
 Marauders Rugby
 Colorado Stags

See also
Rugby union in the United States
Denver Barbarians RFC
Glendale Raptors

References

External links
Official website
USA Rugby Official Site
World Rugby Official Site

Rugby union governing bodies in the United States